Saga of Western Man is a historically themed anthology series television series that aired on ABC Television from 1963 to 1969. Each episode focused on a particular year, person, or incident that producer John H. Secondari felt significantly influenced the progress of Western civilization.

Episode list

Awards 
The series was honored with a Peabody Award in 1963.

The music of the series was nominated for Emmy Awards several times from 1964 to 1966. The nominated composers and performers included Ulpio Minucci, Joe Moon, Rayburn Wright, Erich Leinsdorf, and Claude Frank.

References

External links

1960s American anthology television series
1963 American television series debuts
1969 American television series endings
American Broadcasting Company original programming
Historical television series
Peabody Award-winning television programs
Works by John Secondari